Jonathan Rosen (born 1963) is an American author and editor.

Education
Rosen graduated from Yale and began graduate studies working towards a PhD in English at the University of California, Berkeley.  He dropped out of graduate school to become a writer.

Career
In 1990 he was hired by The Jewish Daily Forward to create an arts section of the paper's then newly editorially independent English language edition, a job he held for 10 years.  As of 2007 he was editorial director of the Nextbook. 

Rosen's Joy Comes in the Morning (2004) features the protagonist, Rabbi Deborah Green, who struggles with the perceptions of women rabbis. This work's inclusion of a woman rabbi is viewed as a significant development in American Jewish writings featuring women rabbis.

Media
 A talk with Jonathan Rosen
 Book Examines Connection Between Humans, Birds (National Public Radio)

Bibliography

 The Life of the Skies: Birding at the End of Nature MacMillan, 2008.
 The Talmud and the Internet : a journey between worlds, Farrar, Straus and Giroux, 2000. (0374272387)
 Joy comes in the morning, Farrar, Straus and Giroux, 2004. (0374180261)

References 

1963 births
Living people
American male writers
The New Yorker people
Yale University alumni